Stephen Ostroff is an American physician. He served as acting commissioner of the U.S. Food and Drug Administration from April 1, 2015, to February 21, 2016.

Biography
Ostroff is a 1981 graduate of the University of Pennsylvania of Medicine. He completed residencies in internal medicine at the University of Colorado Health Sciences Center and in preventive medicine at Centers for Disease Control and Prevention (CDC). He worked at the CDC, the US Public Health Service, and at the Bureau of Epidemiology of Pennsylvania. In 2013, Ostroff joined the FDA as chief medical officer in the Center for Food Safety and Applied Nutrition and senior public health advisor to FDA's Office of Foods and Veterinary Medicine and was promoted to chief scientist in 2014.

References

20th-century American physicians
21st-century American physicians
Commissioners of the Food and Drug Administration
Living people
Obama administration personnel
Year of birth missing (living people)
Trump administration personnel